Ngundu is a village in Chivi District in Masvingo Province in Zimbabwe.

Pre-1950 Ngundu Halt was a stopping point for the Rhodesia Railways Road Motor Service, or RMS. There was a small roof topped structure with a secure door where the mailbag was dropped for Triangle Estates and for other residents in the Lowveld. The road was tar strips on the Fort Victoria (now Masvingo) - Beit Bridge road, and dirt from the halt to Triangle. Local bus services stopped there and small traders selling corn on the cob and other travel-related foods did a brisk trade when the buses stopped.

Rufus Paul noted that it was a point at which there was a need for a filling station and a country store. He applied to the Native Commissioner for a permit to build both and homes for himself and his staff, the NC allowed this, and for a small annual rent, £4.00, a four-acre plot was allocated and Paul's Ngundu Store was born. This was about 1948.

There was a drought in 1950. Many villagers were unable to reap for their household use, and they borrowed a bag of maize (corn) at a time as required. All bar one (who had a good reason) paid their loans back, something that impressed the Pauls immensely. A bond had been created with the locals.

The store was nestled amongst m'sasa tree covered kopjies, and behind it was a huge drop into the lower country below. One could sit on a rock and observe the activities of the local folk as they went about their activities. There were many exotic flowering trees and flowers planted.

Rufus Paul was a Seventh-Day Adventist and the store was closed sunset Friday to sunset Saturday. Motorists who were short of fuel were given, free of charge, enough fuel to move on to the next filling station. Churches and schools run by the church were built with the aid of Rufus Paul. The store had a small clinic and a vehicle was on standby to ferry emergencies either to Lundi Mission, Chibi Clinic or Morgenster Mission, depending on their severity.

The store was sold in about 1970 to Norman Richards who subsequently sold it. The writer has not any knowledge of the current owner.

Ngundusberg resort was also created in 2020, 300m from Chiredzi turn off by the Mupasi Family Trust with the intention to sustain the vision of the Paul family, providing accommodation for the people travelling to the rest of Africa and carter for tourists coming to the largest inland lake of Zimbabwe (Tokwe-Mukosi)
It is now a complete little town, electricity laid on, and services such as police station, primary and secondary schools are present.

References

Populated places in Masvingo Province